Gunnar D. Hansson (born 1945 on the island Smögen in Sweden), is an author, poet, essayist, translator and associate professor of literature at Göteborg University. He is an acclaimed translator of several works, including Old English poetry.

Bibliography
 Övergångar 1979
 De dödas traditioner 1980
 Avbilder 1982
 Otid 1985
 Nådens oordning 1988 (dissertation)
 Martin Koch 1988
 Olunn 1989
 Lunnebok 1991
 Idegransöarna 1994
 AB Neandertal 1996
 Ärans hospital 1999
 Förlusten av Norge 2000
 Senecaprogrammet 2004
 Lyckans berså 2008
 Lomonosovryggen 2009

Awards
 Göteborgs-Postens litteraturpris 1994
 De Nios Vinterpris 1994
 Lars Ahlin-stipendiet 1998
 Sveriges Radios Lyrikpris 2000
 Bellmanpriset 2004
 Tegnérpriset 2006

1945 births
Living people
People from Sotenäs Municipality
20th-century Swedish novelists
21st-century Swedish novelists
Swedish-language writers
University of Gothenburg alumni
Academic staff of the University of Gothenburg
Swedish male novelists
20th-century Swedish male writers
21st-century male writers